Al-Jafr may refer to:

Al-Jafr, Saudi Arabia
Al-Jafr, Jordan
Al Jafr prison
Al-Jafr (book), a mystical Shia holy book

See also
Jafr, Rasht District, Tajikistan